Aschorjyo Prodeep is a 2013 Indian Bengali-language film directed by Anik Dutta. The film is based on a short story by Shirshendu Mukhopadhyay. It is Dutta's second feature film as a director. The film's theatrical trailer was released on YouTube on 26 October 2013 while the film released on 15 November 2013 in Kolkata. The film deals with the unfulfilled aspirations of an everyday couple whose dreams never become reality and as they try hard to excel in life. Anilabha discovers a magic lamp from which a genie emerges and is able to take him to unseen heights in life that he never reached before and also life of extreme luxury and fortunes. How they adjust and cope with their new-found lives forms the rest of the story.

Theme 
This is a modern-day fantasy tale and deals with contemporary consumerist society and consumerist trends.

Cast 
 Saswata Chatterjee as Anilabha Gupto, an everyday salesman who chances upon a magic lamp. Anilabho is referred to by the genie as Anilda which is an Anagram of Aladin.
 Sreelekha Mitra as Jhumur Gupto, Anilabho's wife with dual identity who works part-time in a salon and like her husband she too is a victim of consumerism and aspires big while urging her husband to perform better in his work field.
 Rajatava Dutta as Prodeep Dutta alias Deepak Das who is actually the Genie.
 Mumtaz Sorcar as Mala Maal, a Bollywood actress and the sex symbol fantasied by Anilabho.
 Paran Bandopadhyay As Avinash Babu, owner of Mahamaya Studio Supplies and Auction House.
 Kharaj Mukherjee as Haridas Paul, a sculptor at Kumortuli.
 Deb Roy as Progyan Da
 Arindam Sil as Mr. Pakrashi, Anil's superior in work.
 Mir as Balaram Deb aka Bob Deb, an escort agent.
 Ekavali Khanna as Ekabali Khanna
 Dwijen Bandopadhyay as Sanyal Da
 Sudarshan Chakraborty as KK, Anilabho's image consultant.
 Bobby Chakraborty as waiter at restaurant.
 Rupa Bhattacharya as Miss Pompa
 Biswanath Basu as Bokbokdharmik, an astrologer.
 Manoj Mitra
 Anindyo Chattopadhyay
 Sanjoy Biswas
 Sumit Samaddar
 Anjan Mahato

Development 
In an interview with "Ebela" Anik Dutta revealed that he wrote the script of Ashchorjyo Prodeep a long time back, during his days as an advertisement director even before he wrote that of Bhooter Bhabishyat.

Filming 
In The Times of India of 4 December 2012, Anik Dutta revealed his plans of starting shooting by 11 December 2012 and completing it within January 2013. When asked about shooting in tailor made seasons like that of Durga Puja or Poila Boishakh, which are preferred by most directors, he stated that these issues were to be decided by the producers and not by him. Shooting started as expected in Shree Narayan Studio of Joka, Kolkata. Actor Rajatava Dutta got his head shaved for the first time for a film.

Soundtrack 

The soundtrack of the film has been composed by Raja Narayan Deb who had also collaborated with the Anik Dutta, the director on his first and previous directorial venture, Bhooter Bhabishyat. The film being based upon a middle-class man's overnight meteoric rise catapulted by his finding of a magic lamp, the soundtrack and the songs are also composed and written keeping in mind this aspect of the theme. The music changes after Anilabho (Saswata Chatterjee) discovers the lamp. It is subtle with the use of flute, clarinet, and oboe initially but after finding the magic lamp it grows more flashier and urban complete with bling using electronic sounds as well as heavy use of drums and guitars . The title song is replete with Arabic flavour and is sung by Timir and Rishi Chanda. It is a mish-mash of Arabic percussion that gradually paves the way for rock-infused track. The film consists of an item song Gimme More, sung by Tanya Sen, a member of Indie Band titled "Zoo" and has western and classical touch with the video version featuring Mumtaz Sorcar. The third song of the film titled Makeover song captures Chatterjee's drastic change from a common man to an uptown high society person. Another song called Office Office inspired by Hollywood musicals such as Fiddler On The Roof, Sound of Music and My Fair Lady among others is sung by the lead actors Chatterjee and Rajatava Dutta and Deb Roy ( Co-writer & Associate Director of the Film); the reason for doing so is the ability of the actors to personify the song as they portray the characters on-screen. Raja Narayan Deb also collaborates with Amit Kumar, son of legendary singer, Kishore Kumar for the song Charidik bodle gechhe a rendition of Prithibi bodle gechhe, sung by Kumar; Kumar also raps in the song. Though the melody and arrangements are still the same, the lyrics have been re-written by the director himself incorporating Dubstep, breakbeat and House elements into the song. Thus the entire soundtrack consists of these five tracks. The video for the item song Gimme More inspired by Mozart's 40th Symphony was released on YouTube on 1 November 2013. The video for the second songm called "Makeover Song", was released on YouTube on 4 November 2013 sung by Dibyendu Mukherjee, written by Anik Dutta and choreographed by Sudarshan Chakraborty featuring Rajatava Dutta and Saswata Chatterjee among others.

Bonus Track

Release and reception 

The film released on 15 November 2013. A digital poster was released on YouTube on 26 October 2013 featuring Rajatava Dutta, Saswata Chatterjee, Sreelekha Mitra and Mumtaz Sorcar. Saswata and Sreelekha Mitra's work received praise.

Box office 

See also 
 Chayamoy
 Gosainbaganer Bhoot
 Goynar Baksho

Notes

References

External links 
 
 

2013 films
Films shot in Kolkata
Indian satirical films
Films based on Indian novels
Films based on non-fiction books
Films scored by Raja Narayan Deb
2013 comedy-drama films
Films based on works by Shirshendu Mukhopadhyay
Films directed by Anik Dutta
Bengali-language Indian films
2010s Bengali-language films
2013 comedy films